Cristian Gonzalo García (born 13 April 1974) is an Argentine former professional footballer who played as a defender.

Career
Talleres were García's opening senior club, he began his career with the Córdoba team in 1995 and remained for two years before moving from Primera B Nacional to the Argentine Primera División with Independiente. Five appearances followed, before he completed a return to Talleres where he went on to win the 1999 Copa CONMEBOL; beating CSA in the final over two legs. In 2000, García made a move to Mexican football by joining Toros Neza. One goal across fifteen matches followed. Categoría Primera A side América de Cali signed García ahead of the 2001 season, which they won though he played just thrice.

García went back to Argentina to have subsequent spells with Argentinos Juniors, Nueva Chicago and Quilmes in the Primera División, prior to resigning with Talleres for a third time in 2005; he took his appearance tally for them to eighty-five. In the succeeding year, García rejoined another ex-club in Nueva Chicago. 2006 saw Jorge Wilstermann of the Bolivian Primera División become García's third and final move abroad. He participated in eight matches as they won the 2006 title. Alumni and Tiro Federal were the last clubs of García's career, which saw him make a total of thirty-seven appearances and score two goals before retiring.

After retirement, García became a folklore singer and got into real estate in the Totoral Department area.

Career statistics

Honours
Talleres
Copa CONMEBOL: 1999

América de Cali
Categoría Primera A: 2001

Jorge Wilstermann
Bolivian Primera División: 2006

References

External links

1974 births
Living people
Sportspeople from Córdoba Province, Argentina
Argentine footballers
Association football defenders
Argentine expatriate footballers
Expatriate footballers in Mexico
Expatriate footballers in Colombia
Expatriate footballers in Bolivia
Argentine expatriate sportspeople in Mexico
Argentine expatriate sportspeople in Colombia
Argentine expatriate sportspeople in Bolivia
Primera Nacional players
Argentine Primera División players
Ascenso MX players
Categoría Primera A players
Bolivian Primera División players
Torneo Argentino A players
Torneo Argentino B players
Talleres de Córdoba footballers
Club Atlético Independiente footballers
Toros Neza footballers
América de Cali footballers
Argentinos Juniors footballers
Nueva Chicago footballers
Quilmes Atlético Club footballers
C.D. Jorge Wilstermann players
Alumni de Villa María players